Robert Sharpe (20 December 1925 – 21 February 2014) was a Scottish footballer who played as a right back in the Scottish League for Raith Rovers and in the English Football League for Darlington.

Life and career
Sharpe was born in Kirkcaldy. He played for Dunfermline Athletic in the 1945–46 wartime league before being reinstated as a junior with Thornton Hibs in 1947. By 1949 he was at Rosyth Recreation, helping the club to the top of the Fife Junior League. In February 1951, after Rosyth had beaten them in the Scottish Junior Cup, the Luncarty club protested Sharpe's inclusion, claiming that his reinstatement as a junior was faulty because he had never previously played as such, having moved directly from juvenile football to a senior club. The Scottish Junior Football Association concurred.

Sharpe moved on to Raith Rovers of Scottish League Division One, for whom he appeared for the reserves but only once in a League match. He became one of several Scots recruited in the 1952 close season by Bob Gurney for English Third Division North club Darlington. He played 14 League matches in the 1952–53 season, and then moved into non-league football with Blackhall Colliery Welfare.

He settled in Darlington, County Durham, where he worked at a garage and as a taxi driver and continued to attend Darlington F.C.'s matches. He was married to Jean and had a son. He died in February 2014.

References

1925 births
2014 deaths
Footballers from Kirkcaldy
Scottish footballers
Association football fullbacks
Dunfermline Athletic F.C. players
Raith Rovers F.C. players
Darlington F.C. players
Blackhall Colliery Welfare F.C. players
Scottish Football League players
Scottish Junior Football Association players
English Football League players
British taxi drivers
Place of death missing